Olayinka Koso-Thomas (born 1937) is a Nigerian-born doctor who lives in Sierra Leone. She is known internationally for her efforts to abolish female genital cutting. In 1998, she shared a Prince of Asturias Award for this work.

References

1937 births
Living people
Yoruba women physicians
20th-century Nigerian medical doctors
Sierra Leone Creole people
Nigerian women medical doctors
20th-century Sierra Leonean physicians